The National Association of Colleges and Employers (NACE) is an American nonprofit professional association established in 1956 in Bethlehem, Pennsylvania, for college career services, recruiting practitioners, and others who wish to hire the college educated.

NACE connects more than 8,100 college career services professionals at nearly 2,000 colleges and universities nationwide, more than 3,100 university relations and recruiting professionals, and the business affiliates that serve this community.

NACE is the leading source of information on the employment of the college educated, and forecasts hiring and trends in the job market; tracks starting salaries, recruiting and hiring practices, and student attitudes and outcomes; and identifies best practices and benchmarks.

Ethics and professional standards 
NACE members operate under the association's Principles for Professional Conduct, its code of ethics. The association provides its career services members with guidelines for their operations through the Professional Standards for College & University Career Services and employer members through Professional Standards for University Relations and Recruiting.

Research 
NACE conducts research into four main areas: 1) benchmarks for members on their operations and professional practices; 2) the hiring outlook for new college graduates; 3) starting salary offers to new college graduates; and 4) student attitudes about careers, the job search, and employers.

Publications and events 
NACE publishes a quarterly journal and biweekly newsletter for its members. It also publishes a survey of salary offers (Salary Survey) three times a year.

NACE hosts an annual conference, a five-day training management program for career services professionals (the Management Leadership Institute), a two-day management training program for university recruiters (Recruiter Leadership Institute), workshops, roundtables, and virtual seminars. NACE Professional Development provides an extensive selection of ICF-, CCE-, NBCC-, and HRCI-approved courses to satisfy continuing education requirements.

External links 

Non-profit organizations based in Pennsylvania
Recruitment
Employment in the United States